Adiós, Sabata (lit. "Indio Black, you know what I'm going to tell you... You're a big son of a...") is a 1970 Italian Spaghetti Western film directed by Gianfranco Parolini. It is the second film in The Sabata Trilogy by Parolini. Yul Brynner takes over the lead role from Lee Van Cleef, who stars in the first and third films.

Plot
Set in Mexico under the rule of Emperor Maximilian I, Sabata is hired by the guerrilla leader Señor Ocaño to steal a wagonload of gold from the Austrian army. However, when Sabata and his partners Escudo and Ballantine obtain the wagon, they find it is not full of gold but of sand, and that the gold was taken by Austrian Colonel Skimmel. So Sabata plans to steal back the gold.

Cast

Release
Adiós, Sabata was first released in 1970.

Reception
In contemporary reviews, Tom Milne of the Monthly Film Bulletin reviewed a dubbed version of the film. Milne found that "the rather routine proceedings are enlivened from time to time by ingeniously macabre details like the model ship firing from all guns with which Skimmel executes informers, or the "flamenco of death" (spurs glittering ominously on drumming heels) with which Gitano announced the end of enemies of the revolution." Milne commented on "it is a pity that so much of the action is clogged up by that old stand-by of the Italian Western-extras falling off roofs in graceful death-falls. This time the supply of cannon-fodder destined for identical deaths is apparently inexhaustible."

See also
 List of Italian films of 1970

References

Sources

External links

Films directed by Gianfranco Parolini
Films set in Mexico
Second French intervention in Mexico films
Italian sequel films
Spaghetti Western films
United Artists films
1970 Western (genre) films
1970 films
Films produced by Alberto Grimaldi
Films shot in Almería
Films scored by Bruno Nicolai
1970s Italian films